UAN is a solution of urea and ammonium nitrate in water used as a fertilizer. The combination of urea and ammonium nitrate has an extremely low critical relative humidity (18% at 30 °C) and can therefore only be used in liquid fertilizers. The most commonly used grade of these fertilizer solutions is UAN 32.0.0 (32%N) known as UN32 or UN-32, which consists of 45% ammonium nitrate, 35% urea and only 20% water. Other grades are UAN 28, UAN 30 and UAN 18.
Urea–ammonium nitrate solutions should not be combined with calcium ammonium nitrate (CAN-17) or other solutions prepared from calcium nitrate. A thick, milky-white insoluble precipitate forms that may plug nozzles.

Physical and chemical characteristics of urea ammonium nitrate solutions
The solutions contain a remarkably low amount of water and  nevertheless have a low salt-out temperature:

References
 UNIDO and International Fertilizer Development Center (1998), Fertilizer Manual, Kluwer Academic Publishers, .
 Simplot UAN-32 Product Data Sheet
 Poole Chemical UAN 32% Solution
What is UAN and How to get UAN
 Tom Dorn, Extension Educator, '' Nitrogen Sources University of Nebraska Fact Sheet 288-01

Agricultural chemicals
Fertilizers
Nitrogen cycle
Soil improvers